Daan Klomp (born 10 August 1998) is a Dutch professional footballer who plays as a centre back for Canadian Premier League club Cavalry FC.

Early life
He began playing youth football with VV Bevelanders, before moving to JVOZ (Jeugd Voetbal Opleiding Zeeland). Afterwards, he joined the youth system of NAC Breda, where he spent three years before signing a professional contract. During pre-season of the 2016-17 season, he began to train with the first team.

Club career
In August 2017, Klomp signed a three-year contract with Eredivisie club NAC Breda. He was then immediately sent on loan to FC Oss in the second-tier Eerste Divisie. He made his debut in a league match on 8 September 2017, as a last minute substitute against  FC Dordrecht, and made his first start in a KNVB Cup match on 19 September against Almere City FC. In October 2017, he suffered an ACL injury that kept him out of action for a couple of months. After limited playing time, he was recalled from his loan after six months. For the 2018-19 season, rather than being sent on loan again, he was kept by Breda for the season. He made his official debut for Breda in a KNVB Cup match against RKC Waalwijk on 25 September 2018. On 24 November 2018, he made his Eredivisie debut for Breda against Ajax.

In June 2020, he joined Helmond Sport in the second tier Eerste Divisie on loan. He made his debut in the first game of the season against FC Volendam. In April 2020, he was informed that his contract would not be renewed by Breda upon its expiry at the end of June 2020, ending his time with the club, which included nine appearances with the club as well as two loan stints.

After his contract expired, he trained with Team VVCS, the football team of the Vereniging van Contractspelers (Association of Contract Players) (VVCS) for professional footballers in the Netherlands without a contract. He also trained with fourth tier club VV Goes. He had neared a deal with a club in Norway, however, it failed to materialize due to the COVID-19 pandemic. Klomp then had a trial in Germany as well as offers from clubs in Sweden, Finland, and a number of Dutch amateur clubs. In November 2020, one of his agents made contact with Canadian Premier League club Cavalry FC, although an agreement could not be reached at that time.

In January 2021, his agents again made contact with Cavalry FC, and this time he signed a contract with the club. However, the start of the season was delayed due to the COVID-19 pandemic, until he finally made his debut in the first game of the season on 27 June 2021 against York United FC. He scored his first goal on 3 August, scoring the winning goal in a 2-1 victory over FC Edmonton. He scored another game-winning goal against Edmonton on 29 September. He was named to the league Team of the Week seven times in 2021 and in July 2021, he was named the CPL Player of the Week for the first time for Week 4 of the season. In late October, he was again named the league Player of the Week. In his first season with Cavalry, he helped them reach the playoff semi-finals, where they were defeated by eventual champions Pacific FC. In January 2022, he re-signed with the club for another season. In his second season, he scored a playoff goal in the first leg of the semi-finals, but his team was again eliminated in the playoff semi-finals, this time against eventual champions Forge FC. In December 2022, he again extended his contract, with a club option for 2024. He has expressed a desire to join a Major League Soccer club after his time with Cavalry.

Career statistics

References

External links
 
 

1998 births
Living people
Association football defenders
Dutch footballers
Footballers from Zeeland
Dutch expatriate footballers
Expatriate soccer players in Canada
Dutch expatriate sportspeople in Canada
NAC Breda players
TOP Oss players
Helmond Sport players
Cavalry FC players
Eredivisie players
Eerste Divisie players
Canadian Premier League players